The South Sudan Broadcasting Corporation (SSBC) is a national public service broadcaster in South Sudan. SSBC provides radio stations (AM/FM) as well as television broadcasts through its VHF/UHF analogue transmitters in Juba. It broadcasts its radio and television services via satellite and can be viewed from many places in the world through the Badr 4, Intelsat 19 and Galaxy 19 satellites.

SSBC's headquarters are in central Juba, where it has its studios, television/FM transmitters, satellite uplink and mast.  It also leases facilities to international broadcasters such as the BBC World Service and Radio France.

In 2012 the Government of South Sudan and Japan International Corporation Agency signed a six years $6 Million deal to boost the development of the government media house. In 2018, China announced plans to spend $15Mil USD on developing a new state-of-art studio and also training employees.

Owned and operated station 
 South Sudan Broadcasting Corporation Television
 South Sudan Radio

See also
 Media of South Sudan

References

Public broadcasting in South Sudan
State media
Television stations in South Sudan